Ángel Castro may refer to:
Ángel Castro y Argiz (1875–1956), father of Cuban leaders Raúl and Fidel Castro
Ángel Castro (baseball) (born 1982), Dominican baseball player

See also
Ángela Castro (born 1993), a Bolivian race walker
Angelo Castro Jr. (1945–2012), a Filipino broadcast journalist and actor
Castro (surname)